Jazz ...It's Magic! is an album by American jazz trombonist Curtis Fuller, released in January 1958 on the Regent label, a subsidiary of Savoy Records.

Reception

The AllMusic review by Jim Todd awarded the album 3 stars out of 5 and stated: "On Fuller's Jazz...It's Magic, the hard bop prototype is still under refinement, but it's easy to enjoy the music in its essential elements: elegant, bluesy melodies; earthy, yet sophisticated, solo work; and fresh treatments of standards."

Track listing
All compositions by Curtis Fuller except as indicated
"Two Ton" – 4:48
"Medley: It's Magic/My One and Only Love/They Didn't Believe Me"  (Jule Styne, Sammy Cahn/ Guy Wood, Robert Mellin/Jerome Kern, Herbert Reynolds) – 13:41
"Soul Station" – 5:42
"Club Car" – 7:15
"Upper Berth" (Frank Foster) – 8:32

Personnel
Curtis Fuller – trombone
Sonny Red – alto saxophone
Tommy Flanagan – piano
George Tucker – bass
Louis Hayes – drums

References 

1958 albums
Albums recorded at Van Gelder Studio
Savoy Records albums
Curtis Fuller albums